Alan Sakai (born 21 November 1954) is a Canadian judoka. He competed in the men's lightweight event at the 1972 Summer Olympics.

References

1954 births
Living people
Canadian male judoka
Olympic judoka of Canada
Judoka at the 1972 Summer Olympics
Sportspeople from Vancouver